Sportvereniging Poortugaal is a Dutch  association football club from Poortugaal. It was formed in 2018 as a merger of PSV Poortugaal and VV Oude Maas. Its first squad started in the Eerste Klasse and promoted to the Hoofdklasse in 2020. The club's home ground is  Sportpark Polder Albrandswaard.

History

PSV Poortugaal
The Poortugaalse Sport Vereniging Poortugaal was founded on 20 April 1927. It played at Sportpark Polder Albrandswaard.
 
Dutch female soccer international and coach Hesterine de Reus played during her youth in PSV Portugaal.

In 2016–17, its first squads played in the Sunday Eerste Klasse and in the Saturday Vierde Klasse. In 2017–18 the first squads continue in the same leagues. Starting 2017 coach of the Sunday squad was Jack van den Berg, who coached the Saturday Derde Divisie squad ASWH alongside.

In October 2017 the club decided that the first squad would play starting summer 2017 in the Saturday competition. Subsequently, the club also decided to merge with VV Oude Maas. Henk Dirven was selected to replace Jack van den Berg, who switched for Tweede Divisie-side VV Katwijk.

VV Oude Maas
Voetbalvereniging Oude Maas was founded on 16 May 1947. It played at Sportpark Polder Albrandswaard.

In 2014 VV Oude Maas played in the first round of the National Dutch KNVB Cup, losing 1–3 to the Bergen op Zoom side SV DOSKO. Since 2015 the first team plays in the Eerste Klasse. In 2016 Roël Liefden became coach of the first squad, replacing Warry van Wattum. In the summer of 2018 it merged with PSV Poortugaal.

References

External links
Official website

Football clubs in the Netherlands
Football clubs in South Holland
Sport in Albrandswaard
Association football clubs established in 2018
2018 establishments in the Netherlands